Vernon Ralph Briggs (February 28, 1899 – 1970) was a Canadian politician. He served in the Legislative Assembly of New Brunswick as member of the Liberal party from 1945 to 1952.

References

1899 births
1970 deaths
New Brunswick Liberal Association MLAs